Frigg is a Germanic goddess. 

Frigg may also refer to:

Sports
Frigg Oslo FK, a Norwegian sports club.
Frigg Næstved, a Danish sports club.

Others
Frigg (band), a folk music band.
MV Frigg, an oil tanker
Frigg gas field, a natural gas field.
Frigg UK System, a natural gas pipeline.
Frigg Fjord

See also
Roman Frigg, a Swiss philosopher
Frig (disambiguation)